Frances Tiafoe Jr. (born January 20, 1998) is an American professional tennis player. The Association of Tennis Professionals (ATP) has ranked Tiafoe as high as world No. 14 in singles, on February 6, 2023, and world No. 160 in doubles, on November 1, 2021. Tiafoe won his first and only ATP title at the 2018 Delray Beach Open, becoming the youngest American man to win a tournament on the ATP Tour since Andy Roddick in 2002.

The son of Sierra Leonean immigrants, Tiafoe was raised at the Junior Tennis Champions Center (JTCC), a USTA regional training center in College Park, Maryland, where his father worked as the head of maintenance. His unique background and success as a teenager led him to be widely regarded as a great prospect to become one of the next American tennis stars. At 15, Tiafoe won the 2013 Orange Bowl, the tournament's youngest-ever boys' singles champion. At 17, he became the youngest American in the main draw of the French Open since Michael Chang in 1989. As a teenager, he won the US Junior National Championship and enjoyed success on the ATP Challenger Tour, reaching nine finals and winning four titles.

Tiafoe broke into the top 100 of the ATP rankings in 2016. At the 2019 Australian Open, he reached the quarterfinals, and at the 2022 US Open, he reached the semifinals of a Grand Slam tournament for the first time.

Early life and background
Frances Tiafoe was born on January 20, 1998, along with his twin brother Franklin, in Maryland, to Constant (better known as Frances Sr.) Tiafoe and Alphina Kamara, immigrants from Sierra Leone. His father immigrated to the United States in 1993, while his mother joined him in 1996 to escape the civil war in their country. In 1999, his father began working as a day laborer on a construction crew that built the Junior Tennis Champions Center in College Park, Maryland. When the facility was completed, he was hired as the on-site custodian and given a spare office to live in at the center. Frances and Franklin lived with their father at the center for five days a week for the next 11 years. They took advantage of their living situation to start playing tennis regularly at age 4. They stayed with their mother when she was not working night shifts as a nurse.

When Tiafoe and his brother were 5 years old, their father arranged for them to begin training at the JTCC, bypassing their usual fees. At age 8, Misha Kouznetsov began coaching Tiafoe at the center, taking interest in him after seeing his work ethic and interest in the sport. Kouznetsov helped sponsor Tiafoe to play at tournaments as he progressed through the juniors. He continued to coach Tiafoe for nine years until he moved to the USTA National Training Center in Boca Raton, Florida. Frances's brother Franklin stayed in Maryland, where he played high school tennis at DeMatha Catholic High School and later played college tennis at Salisbury University.

Junior career

Tiafoe won enough high-level junior titles to reach world No. 2 in the International Tennis Federation (ITF) junior rankings. His success at the juniors combined with his unusual upbringing helped him rise to national prominence before he turned pro. At the age of 14, Tiafoe won his first prestigious international tournament at Les Petits As in France. The following year, in December 2013, Tiafoe became the youngest player to win the Orange Bowl, one of the highest-tier Grade A events on the ITF Junior Circuit. He defeated compatriot Stefan Kozlov in the final a month before turning 16 years old. Several months later, he also won the Easter Bowl, a second-tier Grade B1 event.

With these two big titles, Tiafoe was the top seed at the 2014 French Open junior tournament, where he was upset in the second round. He then lost at Wimbledon to the eventual champion Noah Rubin. Tiafoe produced his best result at a junior Grand Slam tournament at the US Open, where he reached the semifinals before losing a tight match to Quentin Halys. That was the last ITF tournament he would play at the junior level. In August 2015, Tiafoe capped his junior career by winning the USTA Junior National Championship at the age of 17. Tiafoe defeated Stefan Kozlov in the final in a five-set match, taking the first two sets and the last. With the win, he earned a wild card into the main draw at the 2015 US Open.

Junior Grand Slam results – Singles
Australian Open: A (-)	
French Open: 2R (2014)
Wimbledon: 3R (2014)
US Open: SF (2014)

Professional career

2014–15: French and US Open debuts

Tiafoe made his ATP Tour main draw debut at the age of 16 and a half after being granted a wildcard by his home tournament, the 2014 Washington Open. He lost to Evgeny Donskoy in his first career tour-level match. At the 2014 US Open, Tiafoe received a wildcard into the qualifying draw but lost to 11th seed Tatsuma Ito. In the doubles tournament, he was awarded a wildcard into the main draw with Michael Mmoh. The two teenagers picked up their first career win at the ATP level in the first round by defeating veterans Víctor Estrella Burgos and Teymuraz Gabashvili, before losing in the second round. In March 2015, he claimed his first professional title by winning the ITF Futures tournament at Bakersfield. He officially turned pro the following month.

In April 2015, Tiafoe broke through onto the ATP Challenger level. After starting the month ranked below the top 800 in the world, he put together a string of solid results that pushed him into the top 300 in the world by the time the first set of ATP rankings were published in May. Even though his ranking was too low to gain direct entry into any of the three American clay-court Challenger events, Tiafoe reached the quarterfinals of Sarasota as a qualifier, then reached the semifinals of Savannah as a wildcard, and finally reached his first career Challenger final at Tallahassee with a special exempt. At the last tournament, he defeated top seed Facundo Bagnis to notch his first win against a top-100 opponent. Tiafoe's performance at these events was good enough to win the 2015 Har-Tru Challenge and earn the only American wildcard spot into the main draw of the 2015 French Open. In his Grand Slam debut, Tiafoe lost his first-round match to Martin Kližan. Nonetheless, he became the first 17-year-old American to play in the main draw of the men's singles tournament since Michael Chang and Pete Sampras in 1989.

At the Winston-Salem Open in August, Tiafoe entered the main draw as a qualifier and won his first ATP Tour-level match, after defeating James Duckworth in a third-set tiebreaker. He then made his main-draw debut at the US Open with the wildcard he earned from winning the junior national championship. He would lose to the No. 22 seed Viktor Troicki in the first round. After the US Open, Tiafoe continued his success on the Challenger Tour and reached a second final at Knoxville, losing to Dan Evans. Driven by his success at the Challenger level, Tiafoe climbed to a year-end ranking of 176, cracking the top 200 a few months before turning 18 years old.

2016: Challenger titles and top 100

In the 2016 season, Tiafoe consistently produced deep tournament runs at the Challenger level, but was unable to break through in his few opportunities at the ATP Tour level. At the Indian Wells Masters, Tiafoe was awarded a wild card into the main draw and won his first-round match against his compatriot rival, No. 80 Taylor Fritz, in their first ever ATP-level match. This would turn out to be his only ATP match win of the year. He lost his next match to David Goffin in a third-set tiebreak. Tiafoe's best performance in the clay-court season came at Tallahassee where he avenged his loss to Facundo Arguello in the final the previous year by knocking him out in the first round. For the second consecutive year, he was able to reach the final, this time losing to fellow teenager Quentin Halys.

Tiafoe began his return to the North American hardcourts by reaching his second Challenger final of the year at Winnetka before losing to top-seeded Yoshihito Nishioka. He then reached his third consecutive Challenger final in the United States at Lexington. The following week at Granby, Tiafoe reached his fourth Challenger final in five such events in North America. He defeated Marcelo Arévalo in the final to capture his first Challenger title and climb to a career-high ranking of No. 123 in the world. Tiafoe was awarded a wildcard into the US Open, his only Grand Slam main draw of the year. He faced off against American veteran John Isner in the first round and won the first two sets, but eventually lost the match in a fifth-set tiebreak. In October, Tiafoe cracked the top 100 for the first time by winning the maiden event at Stockton, defeating fellow American Noah Rubin in the final. He finished the year ranked 108, making him the highest-ranked player at his age for the second year in a row.

2017: Doubles final

At the Australian Open, Tiafoe began the year by reaching the main draw of a Grand Slam through qualifying for the first time and then recording his first career major match win over Mikhail Kukushkin. To close out the winter hard court season, he also qualified for the Miami Masters and won his first round match before falling to Roger Federer. Tiafoe followed up a good start to the year on the hard courts with a very impressive clay court season that helped his ranking climb to No. 65 in the world. He began with the US Men's Clay Court Championships in Houston, where he reached his first career ATP final in the doubles event, after partnering with veteran Dustin Brown as a wildcard entry. He then continued his success on clay by winning back-to-back Challenger titles over the next three weeks at the Sarasota Open on green clay and the Open du Pays d'Aix on red clay, the former of which included a victory over former top-10 player Jürgen Melzer in the semifinals.

In his Wimbledon debut, Tiafoe defeated Robin Haase in four sets for his first win over an opponent ranked in the top-50. He followed this up with his first top-10 win over world No. 7, Alexander Zverev, at the Cincinnati Masters in August. Tiafoe gained more prominence after taking Roger Federer to five sets in his first-round match on Arthur Ashe Stadium at the US Open. In September, captain John McEnroe chose Tiafoe to replace Juan Martín del Potro for Team World in the inaugural Laver Cup, which mostly featured players in the top-25 of the ATP rankings. He lost his only match to Marin Čilić. Tiafoe achieved a year-end ranking inside the top 100 for the first time, but only managed to be named the first alternate for the inaugural Next Generation ATP Finals.

2018: First ATP title and top 50

Tiafoe entered the year having struggled on the ATP Tour, with just nine wins in 38 matches. Nonetheless, he would quadruple that number of wins by the end of the season. At the inaugural New York Open, Tiafoe reached his first career quarterfinal at an ATP Tour-level event before losing to top seed Kevin Anderson. The following week, Tiafoe entered the Delray Beach Open as a wildcard and won his first ATP title after beating Peter Gojowczyk in the final. He became the first wildcard entry to win the tournament. Along the way, he defeated his idol and world No. 10, Juan Martín del Potro, as well as fellow Next Gen players Hyeon Chung and Denis Shapovalov. With the victory, he became the youngest American to win an ATP title since Andy Roddick won the US Clay Court Championships in 2002. Tiafoe's win streak was snapped in the first round of the Indian Wells Masters by his compatriot Ernesto Escobedo. However, he bounced back at the Miami Masters to reach the fourth round, a career-best at a Masters event. He upset Tomáš Berdych in the third round before losing to Kevin Anderson for the second time this year.

Tiafoe continued his success at the ATP level into the clay-court season. He played at the Portugal Open for the first time and made it to his second ATP final of the year, despite needing to save three match points in the first round. He upset the defending champion, No. 11 Pablo Carreño Busta, in the semifinals before losing to hometown favorite João Sousa in the final. Nonetheless, he became the youngest American to reach a clay-court final in Europe since Andre Agassi played in the French Open final in 1990.

Tiafoe followed up on this success at Wimbledon by picking up his first win over a seeded opponent at a major against No. 30, Fernando Verdasco, en route to reaching the third round of a major for the first time. With this performance, he also broke into the top-50 of the ATP rankings after the tournament.

During the US Open Series, Tiafoe had his best result at the Canadian Open. He defeated two top-30 players, including hometown favorite Milos Raonic, before losing to No. 5 Grigor Dimitrov in a third-set tiebreak. At the US Open, Tiafoe won his first career match at the event against No. 29, Adrian Mannarino, before losing to fellow Next Gen player Alex de Minaur in the second round. Following the last major event of the year, Tiafoe made his Davis Cup debut for the United States in the semifinal against Croatia. After easily losing to Marin Čilić in straight sets, Tiafoe played in the fifth and decisive rubber against Borna Ćorić. Despite taking a two set to one lead, he ultimately lost the match as the United States lost the tie. For the second straight year, Tiafoe replaced Juan Martín del Potro in the Laver Cup. He again lost his only match, this time to Dimitrov. At the end of the season, Tiafoe qualified for the Next Gen ATP Finals, having just barely failed to qualify the previous year. He defeated Hubert Hurkacz in his round robin group, but lost to Jaume Munar and the eventual champion, Stefanos Tsitsipas, as he did not advance out of the group. Tiafoe finished the year ranked No. 39 in the world.

2019: Top 30 debut
Tiafoe's biggest result of the year came at the Australian Open, where he made it to the quarterfinals of a major for the first time. During the tournament, he upset No. 5 Kevin Anderson in the second round as well as No. 20, Grigor Dimitrov, in the fourth round before losing to No. 2, Rafael Nadal. As a result of this run, he reached a career-high ranking of world No. 29, on February 11, 2019.

Tiafoe could not build on this success during the rest of the season. He did not win multiple matches at a tournament again until he reached the quarterfinals at the Miami Open, losing to Denis Shapovalov. He could not defend the points from his title at the 2019 Delray Beach Open or his runner-up at the 2019 Estoril Open a year earlier, losing in the first round at the former and in the quarterfinals at the latter. Tiafoe closed out the clay-court season with a first-round loss at the French Open to Filip Krajinović in which he struggled with an illness. He faced more difficult draws at Wimbledon and the US Open, losing to No. 10 Fabio Fognini in the opening round of the former and No. 7 Alexander Zverev in the second round of the latter, despite pushing both opening to five sets. At the end of the season, Tiafoe qualified for the Next Generation ATP Finals. He was placed in a round-robin group with Ugo Humbert, Mikael Ymer, and Jannik Sinner. After an opening-match loss to Sinner, Tiafoe defeated Humbert and Ymer to advance to knockout rounds. There, he was defeated by top seed Alex de Minaur. Tiafoe finished the season ranked No. 47 in the world.

2020: US Open fourth round
Tiafoe dropped out of the top 50 in February, after losing his quarterfinal points from the 2019 Australian Open when he was defeated in the first round of the 2020 Australian Open by Daniil Medvedev.

At the US Open, Tiafoe advanced to the third round of the tournament for the first time by defeating Andreas Seppi of Italy, then John Millman of Australia. In the third round, he knocked out Márton Fucsovics of Hungary in straight sets and moved onto the round of 16, becoming at 22 the youngest American man to advance that far in the US Open since Donald Young in 2011. He lost in straight sets in the round of 16 to the tournament's third seed, Daniil Medvedev of Russia. Tiafoe finished the season ranked No. 59 in the world.

2021: First top-5 win, ATP 500 final

Tiafoe started the year at the Delray Beach Open, where he was beaten by Cameron Norrie in the quarterfinals. He then lost in the second round of the Australian Open and in the first or second rounds of several ATP 250 tournaments. At the Miami Open, he beat top-30 player Dan Evans in a comeback, but lost in the round of 16 to No.1 seed Daniil Medvedev. He did not have good results during the European Clay Swing as he could not qualify for the main draw of the Madrid Masters or the Rome Masters and he lost in the first round of the French Open to Steve Johnson, despite being up two sets to love.

Tiafoe started his grass-court season by defeating Denis Kudla to win the Nottingham Open. Tiafoe reached the quarterfinals at the Queen's Club Championships, where he lost to Denis Shapovalov. Later that grass-court season, Tiafoe had one of his greatest career wins in the first round of Wimbledon, beating world No. 4 and 2021 French Open finalist, Stefanos Tsitsipas, in straight sets to gain his first win against a top-5 player. Tiafoe became just the second American man since 2010 to defeat a top-three seed at a major, joining Sam Querrey, who did it at Wimbledon in both 2016 and 2017. He then defeated Vasek Pospisil in the second round in straight sets to reach the third round at Wimbledon for the second time in his career, where he lost to Karen Khachanov. At the 2020 Olympics, Tiafoe lost in the second round to Tsitsipas, who took his revenge for the Wimbledon loss.

At the Canadian Open, Tiafoe lost in the second round of qualifying to Emil Ruusuvuori, but was awarded a lucky-loser spot in the main draw after fellow American Sebastian Korda withdrew. He defeated qualifier Yoshihito Nishioka in the first round, and then earned his second top-10 victory of the year by upsetting 10th-ranked home favorite Denis Shapovalov in the second round. He lost in the third round to Gaël Monfils. The following week at the Western & Southern Open, Tiafoe defeated Ugo Humbert, but lost in the second round to Diego Schwartzman.

At the US Open, he reached the fourth round for a second consecutive year by defeating fifth seed and world No. 7, Andrey Rublev in a five-set match. Tiafoe was the first American man to reach the second week at the US Open in consecutive years since Andy Roddick and Mardy Fish in 2011–12. He was then defeated by Félix Auger-Aliassime.

Tiafoe had to enter the main draw via qualifying in Vienna, beating Alex Molčan and Lucas Miedler, both in three sets. In the main draw, Tiafoe beat Dušan Lajović in the first round before winning his second match of the year against Tsitsipas, after recovering from a break down in the third set. Tiafoe then beat Diego Schwartzman to reach his first ATP 500 semifinal, where he beat Jannik Sinner after trailing in the second set to reach his first ATP 500 final. He would lose to Alexander Zverev in straight sets in the final.

2022: US Open semifinal, top 20, American No. 2

Tiafoe saw success in the European Clay swing of the season. At the Portugal Open, he defeated Monte-Carlo finalist Alejandro Davidovich Fokina in the quarterfinals and Sebastian Korda in the semifinals. He lost to Sebastián Báez in the final, but reached the top 25 in rankings on May 2, 2022. In his next event, the Madrid Open, Tiafoe lost to Cristian Garín in the first round. Tiafoe, who had played in the French Open six times previously, recorded his first victory at Roland Garros in 2022 with a first-round win over Benjamin Bonzi. In the second round, he lost to David Goffin in four sets. At the 2022 Wimbledon Championships, he reached the round of 16 for the first time at this major. He lost again to Goffin this time, in a tight five-set match that lasted 4 hours and 36 minutes.

At the Atlanta Open, Tiafoe reached the semifinals where he lost to Jenson Brooksby in straight sets. In his next event, at his home tournament of Washington, Tiafoe reached the quarterfinals, but let five match points slip away and lost to Nick Kyrgios in three sets. At the same tournament, he also reached the semifinals in doubles with Alex De Minaur. The next week, at the Canadian Open, Tiafoe reached the second round with a win over Benjamin Bonzi before losing to No. 10 seed Taylor Fritz. His win against Bonzi lifted him to a then-career high-ranking of No. 24, which also made him the No. 2 American player. At the Cincinnati Masters, Tiafoe reached the second round with a win over No. 12 seed Matteo Berrettini.

Tiafoe reached the fourth round of the US Open after defeating 14th seed Diego Schwartzman in the third round. In the fourth round, he recorded the biggest win of his career over No. 2 seed Rafael Nadal to reach the quarterfinals. With his win over the 22-time Grand Slam champion, he became the first American to defeat Nadal at a Major since wildcard James Blake at the 2005 US Open. At age 24, he also became the youngest American man to reach the US Open quarterfinals since Andy Roddick in 2006. He is only the third American to defeat Nadal in a Grand Slam after Roddick (2004) and Blake (2005). Next, he defeated No. 9 seed Andrey Rublev to reach his first major semifinal in his career, becoming the first American man to reach the semifinals in Flushing Meadows since 2006 when Andy Roddick reached the championship match, and the first black American man since Arthur Ashe in 1972. In the semifinals, Tiafoe lost to Carlos Alcaraz in a five set hard-fought match lasting more than four hours. He saved a match point against him in the fourth set, after coming back from two sets to one down, but lost in the decider.

At the 2022 Laver Cup, Tiafoe defeated Stefanos Tsitsipas to seal the victory for Team World.

2023: United Cup champion, top 15 debut
Tiafoe started the season at the inaugural 2023 United Cup, as the No. 2 American male player, where the United States team became champion defeating Italy in the final.

He reached the top 15 following the 2023 Australian Open where he reached the third round.

At the 2023 BNP Paribas Open, he reached his first Masters 1000 semifinal defeating Marcos Giron, Jason Kubler, qualifier Alejandro Tabilo, and former Indian Wells champion Cameron Norrie, for his biggest win of the season, without dropping a set.

World TeamTennis
Tiafoe has played three seasons of World TeamTennis, all with his hometown team the Washington Kastles, making his debut in 2017. He was to return to the Kastles during the 2020 WTT season, but did not play after testing positive for COVID-19.

Playing style
Like many of his top-ranked American contemporaries such as Jack Sock and Sam Querrey, Tiafoe plays an aggressive offensive game that relies on a big serve and powerful forehand. At 6 feet 2 inches tall, Tiafoe can launch serves at over 140 mph, and regularly hits first serves between 120 and 140 mph. After facing him at the 2016 US Open, John Isner said that Tiafoe could return his serve—widely regarded as one of the best in the game—as well as any player on tour outside of Novak Djokovic. He also said that Tiafoe's second serve could use improvement. Tiafoe's most unusual shot is his forehand, which carries heavy topspin and is driven by an unusual arm motion. When Tiafoe won the 2018 Delray Beach Open, he credited an improved serve for his better play in the tournament.

Coaches
From age 8 to 17, Tiafoe was coached at the Junior Tennis Champions Center in Maryland by Misha Kouznetsov, who had played college tennis at UMBC and coached tennis at Robert Morris. Kouznetsov left his job at the JTCC to work with Tiafoe full-time. After Tiafoe moved to Florida to train with the USTA, he was coached by José Higueras from Spain, who had led fellow Americans Michael Chang and Jim Courier to Grand Slam titles. Tiafoe also worked with Nicolás Todero while at USTA. Robby Ginepri, a former US Open semifinalist, began coaching Tiafoe in the fall of 2016. Tiafoe's friend Zack Evenden started to help coach him shortly before he won his first ATP title in 2018. Evenden took over as Tiafoe's primary coach before the start of the 2019 season. In the 2020 season, Tiafoe hired former top-10 player Wayne Ferreira as an additional coach. In July 2021, Tiafoe and Evenden parted ways by mutual agreement, and Ferreira became his primary coach.

Equipment and apparel
Tiafoe has been sponsored by Nike since May 2016. He was previously sponsored by Adidas. Tiafoe endorses the Yonex VCORE Pro 97 tennis racket equipped with Polytour Pro 125 strings. He chose this racket because it helps him "play more aggressively".

Personal life

Tiafoe's tennis idol growing up was Juan Martín del Potro, in part because the Argentine was the first pro to sign a tennis ball for him. The two first faced each other at Acapulco in 2017, with del Potro winning the match in a third-set tiebreak. Tiafoe picked up his first win over his idol at the 2018 Delray Beach Open en route to his first career ATP title.

Tiafoe likes to watch and play basketball, and is a big fan of fellow Washington, D.C. area native Kevin Durant. He is also a fan of Washington area sports teams, including the Washington Commanders in the National Football League, and the Washington Capitals in the National Hockey League.

Tiafoe has embraced his position both as one of the few African American players on the ATP Tour and as a potential role model to youngsters in general, saying, "That's one of my biggest motivations – to get more black people playing tennis... But I'm just trying to inspire everyone, doesn't matter what race... especially younger people."

Tiafoe played in the 2023 NBA Celebrity All-Star Game.

Performance timelines

Singles
Current through the 2023 BNP Paribas Open.

Doubles

ATP career finals

Singles: 5 (1 title, 4 runner-ups)

Doubles: 1 (1 runner-up)

National and international representation

Team competitions finals: 4 (2 titles, 2 runner-ups)

ATP Challenger and ITF Futures finals

Singles: 14 (7 titles, 7 runner–ups)

Doubles: 1 (1 runner–up)

Record against other players

Record against top-10 players

Tiafoe's match record against players who have been ranked in the Top 10, with those who are active in boldface. Only ATP Tour (incl. Grand Slams) main draw, Davis Cup and Laver Cup matches are considered.

Wins over top-10 players
He has a  record against players who were, at the time the match was played, ranked in the top 10.

References

External links
 
 
 

1998 births
Living people
American male tennis players
Tennis players at the 2020 Summer Olympics
African-American male tennis players
Tennis people from Maryland
Sportspeople from the Washington metropolitan area
American people of Sierra Leonean descent
American twins
Twin sportspeople
People from College Park, Maryland
People from Hyattsville, Maryland
Olympic tennis players of the United States
21st-century African-American sportspeople